Kalekuri Prasad (25 October 1964 –  17 May 2013) was a Telugu poet, writer, Dalit revolutionary activist and literary critic of Telugu literature.

Life
Kalekuri Prasad was born in Kanchikacherla village, Krishna district, Andhra Pradesh.

Dalit movement in Andhra Pradesh
Prasad worked in Jananatyamandali, Virsam, and former member of Peoples War Group. He actively participated in the Dalit movement at the time of the Chundur Massacre/Tsundur massacre (1991), Karamchedu massacre (17 July 1985), along with Bojja Tharakam, K.G. Satyamurthi, and others. He participated in the World Conference against Racism 2001, Racial Discrimination, Xenophobia and Related Tolerance (WCAR), which was organised by the United Nations in Durban from 31 August to 8 September.

Works
Prasad's songs have been used in films. He edited magazines. He translated 70 books from English to Telugu including The God of Small Things by Arundhati Roy. He wrote in Telugu "Andhra Predesh lo Dalitulu".

Death
Kalekuri Prasad died on 17 May 2013 at Ongole, Ambedkar Bhavan.

Songs
Karma bhumilo pusina o puvva 
Bhumiki pachani rangesinattlu
Chinni Chinni Asalanni

References

Marxist theorists
Telugu politicians
Indian male folk singers
Telugu poets
Indian male songwriters
Dalit activists
Dalit writers
Telugu writers
Indian male poets
20th-century Indian poets
Poets from Andhra Pradesh
21st-century Indian poets
Activists from Andhra Pradesh
1964 births
2013 deaths